Tamgaon is a Census town situated in Kolhapur district of Maharashtra, India. Kolhapur railway station serves as the nearest railway station and is located approximately 12 kilometers away from Tamgaon.

Geography
The total geographical area of Tamgaon is 8 square kilometers which makes it the 3rd biggest census town by area in the Kolhapur district.

Demographics
According to the 2011 Indian Census, the Tamgaon town consist of approximately 5,223 people.

Climate
The average rainfall per annum in the town is 1048.5 millimeters. The maximum temperature goes up to 40.8 Celsius and the minimum temperature goes down to 11 Celsius.

References

Cities and towns in Kolhapur district